Trajko Rajković (7 December 1937 – 27 May 1970) was a Yugoslav professional basketball player. He represented Yugoslavia internationally.

Playing career
Rajković played for OKK Beograd, during their so-called "Golden Era", in the late 1950s, and the first half of the 1960s, in the Yugoslav First League. Some of his teammates were: Radivoj Korać, Miodrag Nikolić, Bogomir Rajković, Slobodan Gordić and, Milorad Erkić. OKK Beograd's head coaches during that time were, Borislav Stanković and Aleksandar Nikolić, and the club's sports director at the time was Radomir Šaper. In that period, the club won three Yugoslav League championships, and two Yugoslav Cups.

Rajković went to Italy in 1967, where he played two seasons, with Libertas Livorno and Reyer Venezia, of the Lega Basket Serie A. Rajković was the best scorer of the Italian League's 1967– 68 season, with 521 total points scored.

National team career
Rajković played with the senior Yugoslavian national basketball team, from 1963 to 1970. During his senior national team career, Yugoslavia won two EuroBasket silver medals (1965 and 1969), and one bronze medal (1963). They also won an Olympics silver medal (1968), in Mexico City. He also won a FIBA World Cup silver medal (1963), and a gold medal (1970, in Ljubljana, Slovenia). He played in a total of 113 games with the senior Yugoslav national team.

Death
Rajković died in his sleep due to a heart defect, on 28 May 1970, just four days after winning the World Championship with Yugoslavia (Yugoslavia's first-ever gold at the competition).

He is interred in the Alley of Distinguished Citizens in the Belgrade New Cemetery.

Personal life
He had a wife, Biljana, and a son, Vladimir.

Career achievements 
 Yugoslav League champion: 3 (with OKK Beograd: 1960, 1963 and 1964).
 Yugoslav Cup winner: 2 (with OKK Beograd: 1960, 1962).

References

External links
 

1937 births
1970 deaths
Sportspeople from Leskovac
Serbian men's basketball players
Olympic basketball players of Yugoslavia
Olympic silver medalists for Yugoslavia
Olympic medalists in basketball
OKK Beograd players
KK Železničar Beograd players
Medalists at the 1968 Summer Olympics
Basketball players at the 1964 Summer Olympics
Basketball players at the 1968 Summer Olympics
Reyer Venezia players
Serbian expatriate basketball people in Italy
FIBA World Championship-winning players
Burials at Belgrade New Cemetery
Centers (basketball)
Yugoslav men's basketball players
1963 FIBA World Championship players
1967 FIBA World Championship players
1970 FIBA World Championship players